The 1927 season was the sixteenth season for Santos FC.

Squad

Friendly matches

References

External links
Official Site 

Santos
1927
1927 in Brazilian football